Neil Anderson (born April 14, 1982) is an American Republican politician who represents the 36th district in the Illinois Senate. He defeated incumbent Democrat Mike Jacobs in the November 2014 election. The 36th district, located in Western Illinois, includes all or parts of East Moline, Moline, Rock Island, Rock Falls and Sterling.

Anderson defeated incumbent Democratic State Senator Mike Jacobs in the 2014 general election, 55%-45%.

Anderson works as a firefighter/paramedic for the Moline Fire Department and has a wife and two children.

Anderson ran for state representative in 2012 in the 72nd district. He lost to incumbent representative Patrick J. Verschoore by a margin of 64%-35%.

Anderson currently serves on the following committees: Licensed Activities (Minority Spokesperson); Public Safety (Minority Spokesperson); Commerce; Criminal Law; Energy and Public Utilities; Transportation; Redistricting- Northern Illinois; Criminal Law- Clear Compliance.

References

External links
Neil Anderson for State Senate campaign website
Neil Anderson at Ballotpedia

Republican Party Illinois state senators
Politicians from Rock Island, Illinois
University of Nebraska alumni
1982 births
Living people
21st-century American politicians
Politicians from Davenport, Iowa